Richard P. Riendeau (September 22, 1932 – September 20, 2015) was an American football player and coach. He served as the head football coach at Rensselaer Polytechnic Institute in Troy, New York from 1963 to 1972. After serving as the coach of the semi-professional Albany Metro Mallers of the Seaboard Football League, he returned to the college ranks as the head football coach at Oberlin College in Oberlin, Ohio from 1975 to 1978.

References

1932 births
2015 deaths
Oberlin Yeomen football coaches
RPI Engineers football coaches
Springfield Pride football players
St. Lawrence Saints football coaches
Sportspeople from Springfield, Massachusetts
Players of American football from Massachusetts